The Mauritius national football team, nicknamed Club M and Les Dodos (The Dodos), is the national team of Mauritius. They are overseen by the Mauritius Football Association and are members of FIFA, the Confederation of African Football (CAF), and the Council of Southern Africa Football Associations (COSAFA). The head coach is Tony François.

Their most significant achievements are qualification for the 1974 African Cup of Nations, and winning the Indian Ocean Island Games football tournament in 1985 and 2003. They have also been a finalist in this competition in 1990, 2011 and 2019.

History

Early years
Mauritius played its first competitive international game in 1947 against Réunion, which they won 2–1. For the next twenty years, they would only play Réunion and Madagascar (probably due to the close proximity of the three islands to each other) in friendlies and the Indian Ocean Games Triangulaire, which existed from 1947 to 1963. Mauritius won the competition ten times over that time period, were runners-up twice, and came in third once.

1960s–1990s
Starting in 1967, Mauritius began competing against other countries, playing friendlies and entering in such competitions as the Africa Cup of Nations and the FIFA World Cup qualifiers, though they haven't found much success. While they have never qualified for the World Cup finals, they have qualified once for the Africa Cup of Nations, in 1974, however, they were eliminated in the group stages. Mauritius did manage to win the resurrected Indian Ocean Games in 1985. In 1999, after deadly riots caused by supporters of Scouts Club (renamed as Port Louis Sporting Club) angry about a controversial penalty awarded to Fire Brigade Sports Club (now renamed as Pamplemousses SC) in the championship deciding game, which gave Fire Brigade a 1–0 win, all domestic football was suspended for 18 months, and only the national team was allowed to play. This is regarded as the point at which Mauritian football, both on the domestic and international stage, started on a downward slope.

The new millennium to present day
Throughout the new millennium, the national team's performances progressively declined. From a high of the 116th place in the FIFA rankings in 2000, they tumbled down to an all-time low of the 195th place in the Summer of 2011. The best result since the 1974 CAN Championship has been reaching the quarterfinals of the 2004 COSAFA Cup, beating South Africa 2–0 in January 2004. Mauritius eventually lost out 3–1 to the tournament's favourites Zambia. Mauritius has also cycled through many head coaches, especially since the new millennium, but none have had true success. Mauritius did win its second IOG championship in the 2003 edition, held in Mauritius, under head coach Akbar Patel. Besides that, Mauritius has lost a majority of its matches.

During 2017 Africa Cup of Nations qualification, Les Dodos achieved their best results in many year, defeating both Mozambique and Rwanda. However, they were unable to build on these wins, losing to Comoros and then São Tomé and Príncipe in the preliminary round of the next two editions. During the 2023 qualifiers, Mauritius faced São Tomé again and lost 1–0 in the first leg and drew 3–3 at home, failing to progress. Following the result, CAF ruled that one of the São Tomé players was not eligible, awarding Mauritius a 3–0 victory and sending them into the group stages for the first time since 2017.

Team image

Media coverage
For most home games of significant importance, the Mauritius Broadcasting Corporation provides televised coverage.

Kit providers

Supporters' groups
On 30 May 2011, the official fan club of Club M, Kop Moris, was launched. The objective of this club is to build up excitement for Mauritius' games, fill up the stands as much as possible, and create a festive and family-friendly atmosphere. This fan club is officially sanctioned by the MFA.

Stadium
Mauritius plays the majority of their games at Stade George V (cap. 6,200). Games at Stade Anjalay (cap. 18,000) are reserved for higher profile matches. A new modern stadium Complexe Sportif de Côte d'Or, part of a larger sports complex, is currently under construction and is scheduled to be opened in July 2019. Once completed, the stadium will have a capacity of 30,000 seats.

Schedule

2022

2023

Staff

Current staff

Managerial history

  Harry Brophy (1957–59)
  Joseph Le Roy (1959–63)
  Danny McLennan (1963–64)
  Mohammad Anwar Elahee (1970–88)
  Helmut Kosmehl (1976–88)
  Rudi Gutendorf (1993)
  Mohammad Anwar Elahee (1994–96)
  Akbar Patel (1996-97)
  Rudi Gutendorf (1997)
  Ashok Chundunsing (1998)
  Rajen Dorasami &  France L'Aiguille (1998–02)
  Patrick Parizon (2002–03)
  Akbar Patel &   Saoud Lallmahomed (2003)
  Elvis Antoine &  Rajesh Gunesh (2003–05)
  Sarjoo Gowreesunkur (2006)
  Rajen Dorasami &  France L'Aiguille (2006)
  Akbar Patel (2007)
  Ashok Chundunsing (2007–08)
  Benjamin Théodore (2008–09)
  Akbar Patel (2009–14)
  Didier Six (2015)
  Alain Happe (2015–16)
  Joe Tshupula (2016–17)
  Francisco Filho (2017–18)
  Akbar Patel (2018–19)
  Boualem Mankour (2020–2021)
  Tony François (2021–present)

Players

Current squad
The following players were selected for the 2023 Africa Cup of Nations qualification match against São Tomé and Príncipe on 23 and 27 March 2022.

Caps and goals as of 10 July 2022, after the game against Malawi.

Recent call ups

Player records

Players in bold are still active with Mauritius.

Most appearances

Top goalscorers

Competitive record

World Cup record

Africa Cup of Nations record

COSAFA Senior Challenge Cup record
 1997 to 1999 – Did not enter
 2000 – First round knockout
 2001 – Quarter-finals
 2002 to 2003 – First round knockout
 2004 – Quarter-finals
 2005 – Group A final
 2006 – Group A 3rd place
 2007 – Group B final
 2008 – Group A 4th place
 2009 – Group A 3rd place
 2010 – Cancelled
 2013 – Group A 2nd place
 2015 – Group A 3rd place
 2016 – Group B 3rd place
 2017 – Group A 3rd place
 2018 – Group B 3rd place

COSAFA Cup

2000 COSAFA Cup - First round

2001 COSAFA Cup - QF

2002 COSAFA Cup - First round

2003 COSAFA Cup - First round

2004 COSAFA Cup - QF

2005 COSAFA Cup - First round

2006 COSAFA Cup - First round

2007 COSAFA Cup - First round

African Nations Championship record

Head-to-head record
 1–0

Honours
Indian Ocean Games Triangulaire (10) :

 Winners : 1947, 1948, 1949, 1950, 1951, 1952, 1953, 1954, 1956, 1957

Indian Ocean Games (2) :
 Winners : 1985, 2003

See also
 Mauritius national under-17 football team
 Mauritius national under-20 football team
 Mauritius national beach soccer team

References

External links

 Official Site
 FIFA.com: Mauritius national football team profile
 National Football Teams: Mauritius Profile
 Mauritius national football team picture

 
African national association football teams